Noël Turrell (27 October 1947 – 7 July 2006) was a French biathlete. He competed in the relay event at the 1972 Winter Olympics.

References

External links
 

1947 births
2006 deaths
French male biathletes
Olympic biathletes of France
Biathletes at the 1972 Winter Olympics